Elizabeth Estensen (born 10 August 1949) is an English actress, known for portraying the role of Diane Sugden on the ITV soap opera Emmerdale from 1999 to 2021, with a guest stint in 2022. She has also made appearances in various British television series, including The Liver Birds, T-Bag and Coronation Street.

Early and personal life
Estensen was born on 10 August 1949 and had a Norwegian grandfather, from whom she inherited her surname. She grew up in Stockton-on-Tees, County Durham. Her mother was a primary school teacher, and her father was a merchant seaman and solicitor's clerk. Estensen considered becoming a speech therapist, but signed up for a Drama and English teaching course at Manchester Polytechnic instead. Estensen has been married to husband Philip Allen since May 1983, and the pair have a son together, James Otto Allen.

Career
Following graduation from Manchester Polytechnic, she moved to Liverpool and joined the Everyman repertory company. While appearing in a production of John, Paul, George, Ringo ... and Bert, she was noticed by actress Nerys Hughes, who was looking for a replacement for Polly James in her sitcom, The Liver Birds. Estensen was cast as Carol Boswell, her debut television role, in 1975. After The Liver Birds concluded in 1979, Estensen made appearances in films and series including T-Bag and Far from the Madding Crowd. Between 1996 and 1998, she appeared in the ITV soap opera Coronation Street as Pam Middleton. Then in 1999, she was cast in the ITV soap opera Emmerdale as series regular Diane Sugden, a role she has portrayed since. In 2007, she won a shared award at the British Soap Awards for Spectacular Scene of the Year, which saw a house collapse that her character was involved in. In September 2021, Estensen confirmed that she had filmed her final scenes as Diane in Emmerdale. Her final episode was broadcast on 29 October. However, Estensen agreed to return to the soap in October 2022 for a guest stint, for the show’s 50th anniversary.

Filmography

References

External links
 

1949 births
Living people
English soap opera actresses
English television actresses
English people of Norwegian descent
Actors from County Durham
Actors from Stockton-on-Tees